According to the most recent government estimates, the population of South Africa is about 60.6 million people of diverse origins, cultures, languages, and religions. The South African National Census of 2022 was the most recent census held; the next will be in 2032.

In 2011, Statistics South Africa counted 2.1 million foreigners in total. Reports suggest that is an underestimation. The real figure may be as high as five million, including some three million Zimbabweans.

History

Population

Earlier Censuses, 1904 to 2011

1904 Census
South African population figures for the 1904 Census.

1960 Census
Sources: Statesman's Year-Book 1967–1968; Europa Year Book 1969

1904-85 national census numbers 
Bantustan demographics were removed from South African census data during Apartheid and for this reason official figures on the national population of the country during that period will be inaccurate.

1996 Census
Source: The People of South Africa: Population Census, 1996

2001 Census
Source: Statistics South Africa: Census 2001

2011 Census
Source: Census 2011: Census in Brief

Historical and projected population for the years 1 to 2100

UN Age and population estimates: 1950 to 2030
According to the 2019 revision of the United Nations Secretariat's World Population Prospects, South Africa's total population was 55,386,000 in 2015, compared to only 13,628,000 in 1950. In 2015, 29.3% of the people were children under the age of 15, 65.7% were between 15 and 64 years of age, and 5.0% were 65 or older. All population estimates are rounded to the nearest thousand.

UN population projections: 2019 to 2100

Vital statistics

Statistics South Africa: From 2002 to present
The following statistics are obtained from the mid-year population estimates published by Statistics South Africa:

United Nations estimates, 2019
The Population Department of the United Nations prepared the following estimates. (Natural increase or decrease over a time period is the difference between that period's live births and deaths, before accounting for inward or outward migration.)

Age and sex distribution

Age and race distribution

Age distribution within each racial group

By generation

Racial composition of each age group in 2015 (estimates)

By five-year cohorts

Racial composition of each age group in 2020 (estimates) 
Source:

Fertility rate (The Demographic Health Survey)
Fertility rate (TFR) (Wanted Fertility Rate) and CBR (Crude Birth Rate):

Fertility rate (TFR) (Wanted Fertility Rate) by ethnic group.

Life expectancy
Life expectancy at birth from 1950 to 2020 (UN World Population Prospects):

Ethnic groups

Statistics South Africa asks people to describe themselves in the census in terms of five racial population groups. The 2011 census figures for these groups were Black African at 80.2%, White at 8.4%, Coloured at 8.8%, Indian/Asian at 2.5%, and Other/Unspecified at 0.5%.

The white percentage of the population has sharply declined. The first census in South Africa in 1911 showed that whites made up 22% of the population. This declined to 16% in 1980, 8.9% in 2011 and 7.65% in 2022.Coloured South Africans replaced Whites as the largest minority group around 2010.

Languages

South Africa has eleven official languages: isiZulu 22.7%, isiXhosa 16%, Afrikaans 13.5%, English 9.6%, Sepedi 9.1%, Setswana 8%, Sesotho 7.6%, Xitsonga 4.5%, siSwati 2.5%, Tshivenda 2.4% and isiNdebele 2.1%.

In this regard, it is third only to Bolivia and India in number. While all the languages are formally equal, some languages are spoken more than others. According to the 2011 census, the three most spoken first languages are Zulu (22.7%), Xhosa (16.0%), and Afrikaans (13.5%). Despite the fact that English is recognised as the language of commerce and science, it ranked fourth, and was spoken by only 9.6% of South Africans as a first language in 2011.

The country also recognises several unofficial languages, including Sekholokoe, Fanagalo, Khwe, Lobedu, Nama, Northern Ndebele, Phuthi, San and South African Sign Language. These unofficial languages may be used in certain official uses in limited areas where it has been determined that these languages are prevalent. Nevertheless, their populations are not such that they require nationwide recognition.

Many of the "unofficial languages" of the San and Khoikhoi people contain regional dialects stretching northwards into Namibia and Botswana, and elsewhere. These people, who are a physically distinct population from other Africans, have their own cultural identity based on their hunter-gatherer societies. They have been marginalised to a great extent, and many of their languages are in danger of becoming extinct.

Many white South Africans also speak other European languages, such as Portuguese (also spoken by black Angolans and Mozambicans), German, Serbian and Greek, while some Indians and other Asians in South Africa speak South Asian languages, such as Tamil, Hindi, Gujarati, Urdu and Telugu. Although many South Africans are of Huguenot (French) origin, South African French is spoken by fewer than 10,000 individuals country-wide. Congolese French is also spoken in South Africa by migrants.

The primary sign language of deaf South Africans is South African Sign Language. Other sign languages among indigenous peoples are also used.

By ethnicity
In 2011, the first language was Zulu for 28.1% of South African residents, Xhosa for 19.8%, Northern Sotho for 11.2%, Tswana for 9.7%, Sesotho for 9.3%, Tsonga for 5.5%, siSwati for 3.1%, Venda for 2.9%, English for 2.8%, Southern Ndebele for 2.6%, Afrikaans for 1.5%, while 3.4% had another first language.

Among whites, Afrikaans was the first language for 59.1% of the population, compared to 35.0% for English. Other languages accounted for the remaining 5.9%.

Religion

According to the 2001 national census, Christians accounted for 79.7% of the population. This includes Protestant (36.6%), Zionist Christian (11.1%), Pentecostal/Charismatic (8.2%), Roman Catholic (7.1%), Methodist (6.8%), Dutch Reformed (6.7%), Anglican (3.8%); members of other Christian churches accounted for another 36% of the population. Muslims accounted for 1.5% of the population, Other 2.3%, and 1.4% were Unspecified and None 15.1%.

African Indigenous Churches made up the largest of the Christian groups. Some believe that many people claiming no affiliation with any organised religion adhered to traditional indigenous religions. Many people have syncretic religious practices combining Christian and indigenous influences.

Muslims are largely found among the Coloured and Indian ethnic groups. They have been joined by black or white South African converts as well as immigrants from other parts of Africa. South African Muslims claim that their faith is the fastest-growing religion of conversion in the country, with the number of black Muslims growing sixfold, from 12,000 in 1991 to 74,700 in 2004

The Hindu population has its roots in the British colonial period, but later waves of immigration from India have also contributed to it. Most Hindus are of South Asian origin, but there are many who come from mixed racial stock. Some are converts due to the efforts of ISKCON.

Other minority religions in South Africa are Sikhism, Jainism, Baháʼí Faith and Judaism.

By ethnicity
87.9% of Black residents are Christian, 9.5% have no religion, 0.2% are Muslim, 0.0% are Jewish, 1.22% are Hindu and 2.3% have other or undetermined beliefs.

71.8% of White residents are Christian, 23.8% have no religion, 0.2% are Muslim, 1.4% are Jewish, and 0.0% are Hindu. 2.7% have other or undetermined beliefs.

Other demographic statistics

Demographic statistics according to the World Population Review in 2022.

One birth every 27 seconds	
One death every 56 seconds	
One net migrant every 4 minutes	
Net gain of one person every 44 seconds

The following demographics are from the CIA World Factbook unless otherwise indicated.

Population
57,516,665 (2022 est.)
55,380,210 (July 2018 est.)

Age structure

0-14 years: 27.94% (male 7,894,742/female 7,883,266)
15-24 years: 16.8% (male 4,680,587/female 4,804,337)
25-54 years: 42.37% (male 12,099,441/female 11,825,193)
55-64 years: 6.8% (male 1,782,902/female 2,056,988)
65 years and over: 6.09% (2020 est.) (male 1,443,956/female 1,992,205)

0-14 years: 28.18% (male 7,815,651 /female 7,793,261)
15-24 years: 17.24% (male 4,711,480 /female 4,837,897)
25-54 years: 42.05% (male 11,782,848 /female 11,503,831)
55-64 years: 6.71% (male 1,725,034 /female 1,992,035)
65 years and over: 5.81% (male 1,351,991 /female 1,866,182) (2018 est.)

Birth rate
18.56 births/1,000 population (2022 est.) Country comparison to the world: 77th
19.9 births/1,000 population (2018 est.) Country comparison to the world: 78th

Death rate
9.26 deaths/1,000 population (2022 est.) Country comparison to the world: 52nd
9.3 deaths/1,000 population (2018 est.) Country comparison to the world: 57th

Total fertility rate
2.18 children born/woman (2022 est.) Country comparison to the world: 90th
2.26 children born/woman (2018 est.) Country comparison to the world: 91st

Population growth rate
0.93% (2022 est.) Country comparison to the world: 103rd
0.97% (2018 est.) Country comparison to the world: 114th

Median age
Total: 28 years. Country comparison to the world: 142nd
Male: 27.9 years
Female: 28.1 years (2020 est.)

Total: 27.4 years. Country comparison to the world: 144th
Male: 27.2 years 
Female: 27.6 years (2018 est.)

Contraceptive prevalence rate
54.6% (2016)

Net migration rate
0 migrant(s)/1,000 population (2022 est.) Country comparison to the world: 98th
-0.9 migrant(s)/1,000 population (2018 est.) Country comparison to the world: 138th

Dependency ratios
Total dependency ratio: 52.5 (2015 est.)
Youth dependency ratio: 44.8 (2015 est.)
Elderly dependency ratio: 7.7 (2015 est.)
Potential support ratio: 12.9 (2015 est.)

Urbanization
Urban population: 68.3% of total population (2022)
Rate of urbanization: 1.72% annual rate of change (2020-25 est.)

Urban population: 66.4% of total population (2018)
Rate of urbanization: 1.97% annual rate of change (2015-20 est.)

Life expectancy at birth
Total population: 65.32 years. Country comparison to the world: 202nd
Male: 63.99 years
Female: 66.68 years (2022 est.)

Total population: 64.1 years (2018 est.)

Major infectious diseases
Degree of risk: intermediate (2020)
Food or waterborne diseases: bacterial diarrhea, hepatitis A, and typhoid fever
Water contact diseases: schistosomiasis

note: widespread ongoing transmission of a respiratory illness caused by the novel coronavirus (COVID-19) is occurring throughout South Africa; as of 6 June 2022, South Africa has reported a total of 3,968,205 cases of COVID-19 or 6,690.7 cumulative cases of COVID-19 per 100,000 population with a total of 101,317 cumulative deaths or a rate of 170.83 cumulative deaths per 100,000 population; as of 6 June 2022, 36.33% of the population has received at least one dose of COVID-19 vaccine

Ethnic groups
Black African 80.9%, Colored 8.8%, White 7.8%, Indian/Asian 2.6% (2021 est.)

note: Colored is a term used in South Africa, including on the national census, for persons of mixed race ancestry who developed a distinct cultural identity over several hundred years

Languages
isiZulu (official) 24.7%, isiXhosa (official) 15.6%, Afrikaans (official) 12.1%, Sepedi (official) 9.8%, Setswana (official) 8.9%, English (official) 8.4%, Sesotho (official) 8%, Xitsonga (official) 4%, siSwati (official) 2.6%, Tshivenda (official) 2.5%, Khoi, Nama, and San languages 1.9% isiNdebele (official) 1.6% (2017 est.)
note: data represent language spoken most often at home

Education expenditures
6.8% of GDP (2020) Country comparison to the world: 22nd

6.1% of GDP (2017) Country comparison to the world: 34th

Literacy
Definition: age 15 and over can read and write (2015 est.)
Total population: 95%
Male: 95.5%
Female: 94.5% (2019)

Total population: 94.4% 
Male: 95.4% 
Female: 95.4% (2015 est.)

School life expectancy (primary to tertiary education)
Total: 14 years
Male: 13 years
Female: 14 years (2019)

Unemployment, youth ages 15-24
Total: 59.4%
Male: 55.4%
Female: 64.1% (2020 est.)

Immigration

South Africa hosts a sizeable refugee and asylum seeker population. According to the World Refugee Survey 2008, published by the U.S. Committee for Refugees and Immigrants, this population numbered approximately 144,700 in 2007. Groups of refugees and asylum seekers numbering over 10,000 included people from Zimbabwe (48,400), the Democratic Republic of the Congo (24,800), and Somalia (12,900). These populations mainly lived in Johannesburg, Pretoria, Durban, Cape Town, and Port Elizabeth. Many refugees have now also started to work and live in rural areas in provinces such as Mpumalanga and KwaZulu-Natal.

Statistics SA assumes in some of their calculations that there are fewer than 2 million immigrants in South Africa. Other institutions, like the police and Médecins Sans Frontières place estimate the figure at 4 million.

Immigration figures
Immigration assumptions by Statistics South Africa to South Africa based on race.  Negative numbers represent net migration from South Africa to other countries.

Urbanization

"Urban areas contain about two-thirds of the population; many of these consist of huge informal or squatter settlements."

Graphs and maps

See also
 Statistics South Africa
 South African National Census of 2001
 South African National Census of 2011
 Afrikaans-speaking population of South Africa
 Jewish population of South Africa
 Ethnic groups in South Africa by municipality

References

Further reading

External links

Sunday Standard article on Zimbabwe Refugee Crisis
Contains information on the South African middle class
Middle Class in South Africa-Significance, role and impact